Keith James Locke  (born 1944) is a former New Zealand member of parliament who represented the Green Party, being first elected to parliament in 1999 and retiring from parliament at the 2011 election.

He was the Green Party spokesperson on Foreign Affairs, Defence, Ethnic Affairs, Pacific Affairs, Human Rights, Immigration, Police and Auckland Transport. He served on the Foreign Affairs, Defence and Trade Select Committee.

Since retiring from Parliament, Locke has joined the boards of the Auckland Refugee Council and the New Zealand Peace and Conflict Studies Centre Trust.  He writes on political issues for New Zealand newspapers and the Daily Blog.

Family and background
Locke was born and grew up in Christchurch, to Jack and Elsie Locke, prominent lifelong political activists for a wide variety of causes. Their four children were brought up in this environment and followed their parents into a life of activism, (as well as Keith, his sister Maire Leadbeater is a well-known activist and former city councillor for Auckland City Council). His father Jack was under surveillance during the 1951 New Zealand waterfront dispute.

Former Prime Minister Robert Muldoon is said to have described the Lockes as the most "notorious Communist family in New Zealand". The Lockes lived in the Avon Loop area of the Christchurch Central City and were very active in the community notably organising Avon River clean-ups and native tree planting and arguing against development of the area, and in favour of retaining the character of the area.

He attended Christchurch Boys' High School and has a BSc in psychology from the University of Canterbury and then went to Canada for a master's degree in Sociology at the University of Alberta. He studied towards but never completed a Ph.D. in sociology at the University of Toronto, before returning to New Zealand. Locke lectured in sociology at Victoria University from 1970 to 1972, but then decided to leave academia to work as a full-time editor of the fortnightly socialist paper, Socialist Action, from 1972 to 1976. From 1978 to 1984 he worked as an active socialist and unionist in a car factory, railway workshops and meatworks in the Wellington region. In 1985 he moved to Auckland, working in the Auckland City abattoirs, 1985–86. From 1986 to 1990 Locke worked full-time as the national coordinator of the Philippines Solidarity Network, based in Auckland. From 1990 to 1999 he was manager of One World Books, a non-profit bookshop in Auckland specialising in social, environmental and development issues.

Political history
Politically active all his life, he joined the Socialist Action League (SAL) in 1970. By 1972 he was both the National Secretary of the SAL and chairman of "Socialists for Labour". By 1985 Locke had left the SAL but was still involved in various issue movements. These included Latin America, the Philippines and East Timor solidarity movements and the anti-nuclear movement.

In 1989 Jim Anderton broke away from the Labour Party to form the NewLabour Party (NLP). Locke as well as several other former SAL members were given roles in the NLP's first National Council.

In December 1991 the NLP joined with the Greens, Mana Motuhake and the Democrats to form the Alliance Party.

However, by 1997 the Greens had decided to leave the Alliance. Soon after Locke left the Alliance and joined the Greens where he was made foreign affairs spokesperson.

Member of Parliament

In the 1999 election he was elected to Parliament at number 7 on the Green Party list. He was returned to Parliament in the 2002 election again at number 7 on the Green Party list and in the 2005 election at number 5, and in the 2008 election at number 6. In all four elections he stood in the Epsom electorate.

In 2000, Locke had two member's bills drawn from the ballot.  The first, the Intelligence and Security Committee Act Repeal Bill 2000, attempted to reform oversight of the New Zealand Security Intelligence Service and Government Communications Security Bureau.  It was defeated at its first reading.  The second, the International Treaties Bill, attempted to give greater parliamentary oversight of treaty-making.  It was sent to select committee, but ultimately defeated at its second reading in 2003.

In January 2011 Locke announced that he would retire at that year's election. He delivered his valedictory speech on 28 September 2011.

Political viewpoints
As a Member of Parliament, Locke established a profile of being an "unofficial civil liberties watchdog". He was involved in campaigns against the New Zealand Police being armed with Taser guns, and repeal of the law of sedition.

He advocated for refugee rights, most prominently in the drawn-out case of Ahmed Zaoui, an Algerian asylum seeker initially deemed by the New Zealand government to be a security risk, but later allowed to settle in New Zealand with his family.  During his time in Parliament Locke was a leading critic of New Zealand's anti-terrorist legislation, such as the Terrorism Suppression Act 2002, which he argued breached human rights principles.  He also opposed New Zealand's commitment of special forces to the war in Afghanistan.

Long a critic of New Zealand's intelligence services, in 2008 Locke received, under the Privacy Act, a copy of the file the Security Intelligence Service had kept on him from 1955 to 2006, including when he was a Member of Parliament. This surveillance of a sitting Member of Parliament was investigated by the Inspector-General of Intelligence and Security, Paul Neazor, who then recommended that any such files be closed when a person enters Parliament.

Locke supported a New Zealand republic. In his maiden speech, Locke stated "We should also break free of the British Crown and become a republic. The question is not whether the monarchy has a lot of power over us. In practice it doesn't. The problem is that bowing before the British Queen reflects a colonial mentality." In 2002, Locke put forward the Head of State (Referenda) Bill, which if passed would have brought about a referendum on the question of whether New Zealand should become a republic. The Bill was drawn from the Ballot of members' Bills on 14 October 2009 but was defeated at its first reading in April 2010.

Honours and awards
During his 12 years in Parliament, Locke won a number of awards. He was twice named 'Backbencher of the Year', first in 2002 by Vernon Small, then deputy political editor of The New Zealand Herald, and again in 2010 by The Dominion Post political staff. 
He also received the New Zealand Republic's Colonel Allen Bell Award in 2011; the New Zealand Amnesty International's Human Rights Defender Award in 2012; and the Federation of Islamic Associations for New Zealand's Harmony Award in 2013.

In the 2021 New Year Honours, Locke was appointed a Member of the New Zealand Order of Merit, for services to human rights advocacy.

Controversy
His political opponents have referred to him during question time as "Pol Pot" or "the Honourable Member for Cambodia" due to supportive articles he wrote while editor of the New Zealand Socialist Action newspaper about the Khmer Rouge regime under the headline; Cambodia liberated: victory for humanity. Locke claimed his initial support for the Khmer Rouge was because "...many people thought the Khmer Rouge were an adjunct of the Vietnamese communist forces" and that he thought they "...would be better than the regimes they replaced". He also responded that he renounced his support after hearing of their atrocities, while the New Zealand Government of the time continued to express support for the regime.

Similarly, while he opposed the 2001 war in Afghanistan to remove the Taliban, he wrote an article (in Socialist Action) entitled "Why workers should support Soviet action in Afghanistan" in 1980. This led to accusations of hypocrisy. Locke explained that his previous support for the Soviet invasion was the position of the Socialist Action League, that he was wrong to have supported it, that he was incorrect in believing it would protect human rights in Afghanistan, and that he now believed it encouraged Islamic extremist groups.

During the 2005 election he contested the Epsom electorate in Auckland and at a public meeting he promised to run through the streets of Epsom naked if the electorate was won by ACT New Zealand's leader Rodney Hide. Hide won the seat. "I'll do it. I have to," Locke was reported as saying. "I was so confident, but I have turned out to be wrong and I have got to do it." Locke's promise made headlines in media around the world. On Sunday 25 September 2005 Locke walked near-naked down Broadway (a main shopping street in Newmarket, Auckland) wearing shoes, socks, a G-string, and body paint. The paint camouflaged Locke's skin by depicting a suit and tie from the neck down.

References

External links

 Keith Locke's personal website
 Keith Locke page on Green Party website
 Keith Locke bio (NZ Parliament website)

1944 births
Living people
Green Party of Aotearoa New Zealand MPs
New Zealand republicans
New Zealand left-wing activists
People from Christchurch
University of Canterbury alumni
NewLabour Party (New Zealand) politicians
University of Alberta alumni
Alliance (New Zealand political party) politicians
New Zealand list MPs
Unsuccessful candidates in the 1990 New Zealand general election
Unsuccessful candidates in the 1993 New Zealand general election
Unsuccessful candidates in the 1996 New Zealand general election
Members of the New Zealand House of Representatives
21st-century New Zealand politicians
New Zealand bloggers
Members of the New Zealand Order of Merit